The 1983 Navarrese regional election was held on Sunday, 8 May 1983, to elect the 1st Parliament of the Chartered Community of Navarre. All 50 seats in the Parliament were up for election. The election was held simultaneously with regional elections in twelve other autonomous communities and local elections all throughout Spain.

The election resulted in a deadlocked situation: the Spanish Socialist Workers' Party (PSOE) became the largest political force with 20 seats but fell short of an absolute majority, whereas the conservative Navarrese People's Union (UPN) and the People's Coalition—an electoral conglomerate of the People's Alliance (AP), the People's Democratic Party (PDP) and the Liberal Union (UL)—soon announced a political agreement to join their 13 and 8 seats to form the government at the regional level and in the local city councils. The Basque Nationalist Party (PNV) was left holding the balance of power with its 3 seats, as Herri Batasuna (HB) followed a policy of abstentionism. The former ruling party of Spain, the Union of the Democratic Centre (UCD), had chosen to dissolve itself in February 1983 and did not contest the election as a result.

A constitutional conflict erupted in August 1983 as a result of the PSOE and UPN clashing over the law's interpretation as to whom should be proposed as candidate, aggravated after the Parliament's speaker attempted to propose UPN's José Ángel Zubiaur instead of PSOE candidate Gabriel Urralburu for the post. The Spanish Constitutional Court intervened to end the political deadlock ruling in PSOE's favour, and after talks for a prospective government supported by UPN, CP and PNV failed, Gabriel Urralburu was automatically elected as new Navarrese premier in April 1984 and his government sworn in on 4 May, putting an end to one of the most severe political crises in Navarre history.

Overview

Electoral system
The Parliament of Navarre was the devolved, unicameral legislature of the Chartered Community of Navarre, having legislative power in regional matters as defined by the Spanish Constitution and the Reintegration and Enhancement of the Foral Regime of Navarre Law, as well as the ability to vote confidence in or withdraw it from a regional president.

Voting was on the basis of universal suffrage, which comprised all nationals over 18 years of age, registered in Navarre and in full enjoyment of their political rights. The 50 members of the Parliament of Navarre were elected using the D'Hondt method and a closed list proportional representation, with a threshold of five percent of valid votes—which included blank ballots—being applied regionally. Parties not reaching the threshold were not taken into consideration for seat distribution.

The electoral law provided that parties, federations, coalitions and groupings of electors were allowed to present lists of candidates. However, groupings of electors were required to secure the signature of at least 0.1 percent of the electors registered in the constituency for which they sought election—needing to secure, in any case, the signature of 500 electors—. Electors were barred from signing for more than one list of candidates. Concurrently, parties and federations intending to enter in coalition to take part jointly at an election were required to inform the relevant Electoral Commission within fifteen days of the election being called.

Election date
The Foral Deputation of Navarre, in agreement with the Government of Spain, was required to call an election to the Parliament of Navarre within from 1 February to 31 May 1983. In the event of an investiture process failing to elect a regional president within a two-month period from the first ballot, the candidate from the party with the highest number of seats was to be deemed automatically elected.

Opinion polls
The tables below list opinion polling results in reverse chronological order, showing the most recent first and using the dates when the survey fieldwork was done, as opposed to the date of publication. Where the fieldwork dates are unknown, the date of publication is given instead. The highest percentage figure in each polling survey is displayed with its background shaded in the leading party's colour. If a tie ensues, this is applied to the figures with the highest percentages. The "Lead" column on the right shows the percentage-point difference between the parties with the highest percentages in a poll.

Voting preferences
The table below lists raw, unweighted voting preferences.

Results

Aftermath
Investiture processes to elect the President of the Government of Navarre required for an absolute majority—more than half the votes cast—to be obtained in the first ballot. If unsuccessful, a new ballot would be held 48 hours later under the same majority requirement, with successive votes requiring only of a simple majority—more affirmative than negative votes—to succeed. If the proposed candidate was not elected, successive proposals were to be transacted under the same procedure. In the event of the investiture process failing to elect a regional president within a two-month period from the first ballot, the candidate from the party with the highest number of seats was deemed to be automatically elected.

After the regional election, UPN and the People's Coalition formed an alliance to take the post of speaker of the regional Parliament away from the PSOE, electing UPN's Balbino Bados for the post. This allowed both parties to take control of the investiture process and nominate José Ángel Zubiaur as candidate for investiture.

The attempts to form a Zubiaur-led right-wing government were voted down by both PSOE and PNV, which unsuccessfully held exploratory talks to test an agreement to unlock the situation. After the failure of negotiations, PSOE candidate Gabriel Urralburu had hoped to automatically become new regional president on 21 August 1983 under statutory provisions as the candidate from the party with the highest number of seats, but a clash between PSOE and UPN—whose leader Balbino Ados held the presidency of the regional parliament, the office tasked with nominating a prospective president—over the law's interpretation as to whom should be proposed as candidate resulted in a constitutional conflict. The PSOE's stance was that the legal provision from Section 29.3 of the Enhancement Law required the automatic election of the candidate from the largest party in parliament—meaning that Gabriel Urralburu was to become the new Navarrese president—whereas UPN argued that the pre-requisite condition of "candidate" was only obtained by having contested an investiture process, a criterion which up until that point only José Ángel Zubiaur had met.

On 25 August, and against the advice from the Parliament's legal services, Bados attempted to have Zubiaur nominated as new president pending the King's confirmation, a decision which was heavily criticized by all parties but UPN and AP, and which was summarily aborted by the Government of Spain and the regional PSOE bringing the issue to the Constitutional Court. This situation forced incumbent president Juan Manuel Arza to remain in the post in a caretaker capacity until the Court ruled on the issue, in a situation of political and administrative deadlock as the region relied on a prorogued 1982 budget, resigning government members could not be replaced, and legislative and cooperation projects stagnated. This was further aggravated in January 1984 after the Constitutional Court declared as null and void the dismissal in 1980 of previous president Jaime Ignacio del Burgo, reinstating him to the post until the election of the new regional premier.

In February 1984, the Constitutional Court ruled that the investiture process was to be returned to the moment after Zubiaur's fourth failed voting and that a new candidate had to be proposed for a new round of votings, with the mandate to the regional Parliament to designate "the candidate of the political party that has the largest number of seats and that had been proposed as such to the president of Parliament by that party" in the event of no successful investiture. Urralburu was proposed as new candidate for investiture as both PSOE and UPN sought to obtain PNV's support.

Urralburu failed in his attempts to obtain the confidence of parliament, as UPN, CP and PNV started talks to form a coalition government and avoid Urralburu's automatic election in April. On 13 March 1984, Balbino Ados proposed UPN's Juan Cruz Alli for investiture, with a parliamentary session initially scheduled for 22 March, but this attempt was averted as a result of the breakup of negotiations with the PNV, which was internally divided over the support or facilitation-through-abstention of a right-wing government in Navarre as favoured by the party's leadership but not by their local Navarrese branch. José Luis Monge was proposed by AP as a last-ditch attempt to hold an investiture session and prevent Urralburu's election.

With Monge's defeat, Urralburu was set to be proclaimed new Navarrese president on 17 April, allowing the formation of a new government and ending the political deadlock that had resulted from the 1983 regional election.

Notes

References
Opinion poll sources

Other

1983 in Navarre
Navarre
Regional elections in Navarre
May 1983 events in Europe